Navah Miriam Perlman is a concert pianist and chamber musician. Her parents are violinists Toby and Itzhak Perlman.

Education and career
Perlman performed as a soloist with the Greater Miami Youth Symphony Orchestra in 1984, and the Los Angeles American Youth Symphony Orchestra in 1985,. and made her professional debut at age 15 with the Charleston West Virginia Symphony Orchestra in 1986.

Perlman graduated from Brown University in 1992, having switched her major from music to art. She also studied at Juilliard.

In addition to her solo piano career, she frequently performs chamber music, including with violinist Philippe Quint and cellist Zuill Bailey as the Perlman/Quint/Bailey Trio. She is the Artistic Director of LPS Pro Musica in Lake Placid, New York.

Personal life
At age 19, she began showing symptoms of rheumatoid arthritis. As of 2008, she and her husband Robert D. Frost have four children.

Discography
Prokofiev solo piano works, performing Four Pieces from Romeo and Juliet opus 75 (2009).  EMI Classics CD 6 95590 2
Piano trios by Schubert and Shostakovich, with cellist Zuill Bailey and violinist Giora Schmidt (2008).  Telarc CD
The Rose Album, performing David Popper's Requiem for Three Cellos and Piano opus 66, with cellists Matt Haimovitz, Sara Sant'Ambrogio, and Zuill Bailey (2002).  Oxingale Records CD OX2002
Piano Works, Debut, performing piano solos by Bach, Beethoven, Mendelssohn, Chopin, and Prokofiev (2000). EMI Classics CD 5 74019 2

References

External links
Navah Perlman at IMG Artists
Perlman/Quint/Bailey Trio at IMG Artists
Navah Perlman at last.fm
[ Album Credits Allmusic]

1970s births
20th-century American Jews
American classical pianists
American women classical pianists
Living people
21st-century American women pianists
21st-century classical pianists
21st-century American pianists
21st-century American Jews
20th-century American women